Veľký Folkmár is a village and municipality in the Gelnica District in the Košice Region of eastern Slovakia.

References

External links

Official homepage

Villages and municipalities in Gelnica District